The 2022 Coastal Carolina Chanticleers football team represented Coastal Carolina University in the 2022 NCAA Division I FBS football season. The Chanticleers, led by fourth-year head coach Jamey Chadwell, played their home games at Brooks Stadium. They competed in the East Division of the Sun Belt Conference.

Previous season
The Chanticleers finished the 2021 season 11–2, 6–2 in Sun Belt play. They received an invitation to the Cure Bowl where they defeated Northern Illinois marking the school's first ever bowl game victory.

Quarterback Grayson McCall set a new FBS record for single-season passer rating at 207.6, breaking the record set by Alabama's Mac Jones the previous season. Though eligible for the NFL draft as a redshirt sophomore, McCall announced he would return to Coastal for the 2022 season.

Preseason

Media poll
The Sun Belt media days were held on July 25 and July 26. The Chanticleers were predicted to finish in second place in the Sun Belt's East Division. Coastal Carolina also received 2-of-14 first place votes.

Sun Belt Preseason All-Conference teams

Offense

Player of the Year
Grayson McCall – Quarterback, RS-JR

1st team
Grayson McCall – Quarterback, RS-JR
Willie Lampkin – Offensive Lineman, JR

Defense

Player of the Year
Josaiah Stewart – Defensive Lineman, SO

1st team
Josaiah Stewart – Defensive Lineman, SO
D'Jordan Strong – Defensive Back, Super SR

2nd team
Jerrod Clark – Defensive Lineman, RS-SR

Personnel

Schedule
All conference games were announced in early March 2022.

Game summaries

Army

Gardner-Webb

Buffalo

at Georgia State

Georgia Southern

at Louisiana-Monroe

Old Dominion

at Marshall

Appalachian State

Statistics

Southern Miss

at Virginia (Canceled)

at James Madison

at Troy (SBC Championship)

East Carolina (Birmingham Bowl)

Rankings

Notes 
The game between Coastal Carolina and Virginia was canceled on November 16, 2022, following the 2022 University of Virginia shooting.

References 

Coastal Carolina
Coastal Carolina Chanticleers football seasons
Coastal Carolina Chanticleers football